James Walker Howard III (born December 7, 1973) is a former American football quarterback who played college football for the LSU Tigers.

Early years
Howard attended St. Thomas More High School in Lafayette, Louisiana. He lettered in four sports while in high school: football, baseball, track, and basketball. He was drafted in the second round of the 1992 MLB Draft by the Atlanta Braves as a pitcher. Howard, overall pick #59, was selected immediately after the Oakland Athletics selected future MVP and All Star Jason Giambi at #58.

College career
Howard lettered all four years at LSU and was the first true freshman to start at quarterback for LSU since Steve Ensminger in 1976. He started six games, and played in eight, as a freshman, started ten games as a sophomore, nine his junior year and seven as a senior. Howard remained a member of the Atlanta Braves organization while enrolled at LSU and played in the Braves' minor leagues after his freshman and sophomore seasons. In his first three years at LSU, he struggled with interceptions, throwing 17 his junior year.

He returned for his senior season in 1995 as the Tigers' starting quarterback after sitting out the summer from the Atlanta Braves' organization. He injured his shoulder midway through the 1995 season in a game against Florida and missed a month of games.

Howard finished his career as the third-leading passer in LSU history with 6,158 yards and second in career touchdown passes with 34.

Statistics

References

External links
 LSU profile

 Football career statistics and player information from Sports-Reference(CFB)

1973 births
Living people
American football quarterbacks
LSU Tigers football players
People from Lafayette, Louisiana
Players of American football from Louisiana